Alasdair Iain Houston is an English evolutionary biologist and ecologist known for his work in behavioural ecology. He is Emeritus Professor in the School of Biological Sciences at the University of Bristol. He was elected a fellow of the Royal Society in 2012.

References

External links
Faculty page

21st-century British biologists
20th-century British biologists
English ecologists
British evolutionary biologists
Fellows of the Royal Society
Living people
Academics of the University of Bristol
Alumni of the University of Oxford
English biologists
Year of birth missing (living people)